The Colour of Spring is the third studio album by English band Talk Talk, released on 17 February 1986. Written by Mark Hollis and producer Tim Friese-Greene, the album combines elements of jazz and art pop in an effort by Hollis to embrace more organic instrumentation and production values. Unlike previous Talk Talk albums, synthesizers are rarely featured on the album, being replaced by guitar, piano, and organ. The album went on to become Talk Talk's greatest commercial success, spawning the hit singles "Life's What You Make It" and "Living in Another World" and reaching the Top 20 in numerous countries (topping the Dutch charts), including the UK, where it reached No. 8 and stayed in the UK charts for 21 weeks.

Background

The Colour of Spring is commonly viewed as a bridge between Talk Talk's earlier, synthesized pop sound, and their later, more improvisation-based work. Despite the extensive use of synthesizers on the previous two albums, Hollis was vocal in his distaste for them, stating that they were used primarily for economic reasons and that “if they didn’t exist, I’d be delighted.” During the recording of the album, Hollis frequently listened to the music of composers such as Erik Satie, Claude Debussy, and Béla Bartók, with the latter being a particularly significant influence on the album.

Like other Talk Talk albums, outside musicians were heavily utilized. Guests contributing to the album include Robbie McIntosh adding guitar, and Steve Winwood, who played organ on the hit "Living in Another World", alongside "Happiness is Easy" and "I Don't Believe in You".

Reception

The Colour of Spring became the band's highest selling non-compilation studio album, reaching the Top 20 in numerous countries (topping the Dutch charts), including the UK, where it reached No. 8 and stayed in the UK charts for 21 weeks. It did not quite match the sales of its predecessor in the United States but was nonetheless their last album to enter the Billboard 200, reaching number 58. With the international hit "Life's What You Make It", Talk Talk expanded their fan base. The song became the band's fourth of four American hits, along with 1982's "Talk Talk" and 1984's "It's My Life" and "Such a Shame".

The album was included in the book 1001 Albums You Must Hear Before You Die.

Track listing

Personnel
Credits per album notes.

Talk Talk
 Mark Hollis — lead vocals, piano (tracks 3, 5, 6, 7), Variophon (tracks 1, 4 and 7), organ (track 4), Mellotron (track 6), electric guitar (track 8), melodica (track 8)
 Lee Harris — drums (except 4, 7)
 Paul Webb — bass guitar (tracks 2, 4, 5, 6, and 8), backing vocals (tracks 3 and 5)

Additional personnel
 Tim Friese-Greene — producer, piano (tracks 1, 2, and 8), Kurzweil Synthesizer (tracks 1, 4 and 7), organ (tracks 3, 6 and 8), Variophon (tracks 4 and 7), Mellotron (track 3)
 Ian Curnow — synthesizer solos (tracks 2 and 6)
 Martin Ditcham — percussion (tracks 1, 3, 5, 6 and 8)
 Mark Feltham — harmonica (track 5)
 Alan Gorrie — electric bass (track 1)
 Robbie McIntosh — guitar (tracks 1, 2, 5 and 8), Dobro (tracks 4 and 6)
 Morris Pert — percussion (tracks 1, 2, 5, and 8)
 Phil Reis — percussion (track 1)
 David Rhodes — guitar (tracks 3, 5, and 6)
 David Roach — soprano saxophone (tracks 2, 4, and 5)
 Gaynor Sadler — harp (track 2)
 Danny Thompson — acoustic bass (track 1)
 Children from the school of Miss Speake — children's choir (track 1)
 Ambrosian Singers — choir (track 8)
 Steve Winwood — organ (tracks 1, 2, and 5)
Technical
 Dennis Weinrich — engineer
 Dietmar Schillinger — engineer
 Paul Schroeder — engineer
 Pete Wooliscroft — engineer
James Marsh — cover art

Charts

Certifications

References 

Talk Talk albums
1986 albums
EMI Records albums
Progressive pop albums
Experimental pop albums
Art pop albums